Rodopi Peak is an ice-covered peak rising to approximately 500 m in Delchev Ridge, Tangra Mountains, eastern Livingston Islandin the South Shetland Islands, Antarctica.

The peak is named after Rodopi (Rhodope) Mountains in Bulgaria and Greece.

Location
Surmounting Sopot Ice Piedmont to the west and north (Bulgarian mapping in 2005 and 2009).

Maps
 L.L. Ivanov et al. Antarctica: Livingston Island and Greenwich Island, South Shetland Islands. Scale 1:100000 topographic map. Sofia: Antarctic Place-names Commission of Bulgaria, 2005.
 L.L. Ivanov. Antarctica: Livingston Island and Greenwich, Robert, Snow and Smith Islands. Scale 1:120000 topographic map.  Troyan: Manfred Wörner Foundation, 2009.

References
 Rodopi Peak. SCAR Composite Antarctic Gazetteer
 Bulgarian Antarctic Gazetteer. Antarctic Place-names Commission. (details in Bulgarian, basic data in English)

External links
 Rodopi Peak. Copernix satellite image

Tangra Mountains